Trio 64 is an album by American jazz musician Bill Evans, released in 1964. It was Paul Motian's last recording with the pianist.

Reception
Writing for Allmusic, music critic Lindsay Palmer wrote of the album: "The effort spotlights their communal and intuitive musical discourse, hinging on an uncanny ability of the musicians to simultaneously hear and respond."

Track listing
 "Little Lulu" (Kaye, Lippman, Wise) – 3:52
 "A Sleepin' Bee" (Arlen, Capote) – 5:30
 "Always" (Berlin) – 4:03
 "Santa Claus Is Coming to Town" (Coots, Gillespie) – 4:25
 "I'll See You Again" (Coward) – 3:57
 "For Heaven's Sake" (Elise Bretton, Edwards, Donald Meyer) – 4:26
 "Dancing in the Dark" (Dietz, Schwartz) – 4:36
 "Everything Happens to Me" (Adair, Dennis) – 4:51

Bonus tracks on 1997 CD reissue:

"Little Lulu" – 4:39
 "Little Lulu" – 5:07
 "Always" – 4:18
 "I'll See You Again" – 4:30
 "My Heart Stood Still" (Lorenz Hart, Richard Rodgers) – 4:47
 "Always" – 0:44
 "I'll See You Again" – 0:21
 "My Heart Stood Still" – 1:04

Personnel
 Bill Evans – piano
 Gary Peacock – double bass
 Paul Motian – drums

Production notes:
 Jack Maher – liner notes
 Bob Simpson – engineer
 Creed Taylor – producer

References

External links
Jazz Discography

1964 albums
Bill Evans albums
Verve Records albums
Albums produced by Creed Taylor